The Buckhout–Jones Building is a historic commercial building located at 5-13 West Bridge Street in Oswego, Oswego County, New York.

Description and history 
It is a three-story brick building. It was built originally in the 1850s and rebuilt in 1876 after a fire. The building exhibits Gothic and Queen Anne design details. Two fugitive slaves operated barber shops in the building from the 1850s to 1880s.

It was listed on the National Register of Historic Places on December 4, 2001.

Tudor E. Grant
Tudor E. Grant was a former slave whose barbershop business was in the building.

References

Commercial buildings on the National Register of Historic Places in New York (state)
Queen Anne architecture in New York (state)
Gothic Revival architecture in New York (state)
Buildings and structures in Oswego County, New York
National Register of Historic Places in Oswego County, New York